The 2021–22 Eastern Washington Eagles men's basketball team represented Eastern Washington University in the Big Sky Conference during the 2021–22 NCAA Division I men's basketball season. The Eagles, led by first-year head coach David Riley, played their home games on campus at Reese Court in Cheney, Washington.

Previous season
The Eagles finished the 2020–21 season 13–7 overall (12–3, Big Sky, 2nd) and was seeded second in the conference tournament, which they won. Seeded fourteenth in the West regional of the NCAA tournament, they met twelfth-ranked Kansas in the round of 64.

Offseason

Departures

Incoming transfers

2021 incoming recruits

Roster

Schedule and results

|-
!colspan=12 style=| Regular season

|-
!colspan=12 style=| Big Sky tournament

|-
!colspan=12 style=| The Basketball Classic

References

Eastern Washington Eagles men's basketball seasons
Eastern Washington Eagles
Eastern Washington Eagles men's basketball
Eastern Washington Eagles men's basketball
Eastern Washington